Georgios Alexopoulos (born 7 February 1977) is a Greek former professional footballer who played as a centre-back.

Career
Alexopoulos began his career in the academy of Panathinaikos FC and wore the green jersey for 7 years. He was then transferred to Iraklis F.C. and after a year to Egaleo F.C., where he became a leading figure. In the summer of 2005 AEK Athens signed him. Giorgos made 30 appearances in Greek League and also scored 3 goals until he was seriously injured. On 16 April 2008 he returned to full training and is expected to be 100% ready for the next season. In the 2008/09 season Alexopoulos returned and made 12 appearances serving as backup to Daniel Majstorović and Sotirios Kyrgiakos. Alexopoulos joined Ergotelis in the summer of 2010 as a free agent, and finished his career a year later.

Honours

AEK Athens F.C.
Greek Cup: Runners up 2008–09

References

1977 births
Living people
Greece international footballers
Greece under-21 international footballers
Association football central defenders
Iraklis Thessaloniki F.C. players
AEK Athens F.C. players
Panathinaikos F.C. players
Egaleo F.C. players
Ergotelis F.C. players
Super League Greece players
Footballers from Athens
Greek footballers
AEK F.C. non-playing staff